A number of motor vessels have been named Victoria, including:

, an Italian ocean liner
, an Italian ocean liner
, a Kenya ferry in service as of 2012
, a Jordanian cargo ship attacked by Somali pirates in 2008

See also
MS Victoria

Ship names